Love Songs is a 2003 album by American singer-songwriter Barry White.

Chart positions

References

Barry White albums
2003 albums